Fadwa Al-Bouza (born January 14, 1990) is a female Syrian heptathlete and hurdler. She represented Syria at the 2008 Summer Olympics in Beijing, and competed in the women's 100 m hurdles. Al-Bouza ran in the second heat, where she finished in eighth place with a time of 14.24 seconds, and subsequently, did not advance into the later rounds.

At the 2009 Arab Athletics Championships in Damascus, Bouza set both a national record and a personal best time of 13.01, by finishing third in the final of the women's triple jump.

Personal bests
Outdoor
 100 metres hurdles: 14.00 s NU20R (2008)
 Long jump: 5.85 m (2007)
 Triple jump: 13.01 m NR (2009)
 High jump: 1.45 m (2005)
 200 m: 26.01 s (2005)
 Shot put: 8.89 m (2005)
 Javelin throw: 26.10 m (2005)
 800 m: 2:36.18 min (2005)
 Heptathlon: 4555 pts (2005)
Indoor
 800 m: 2:40.00 (2006)
 60 metres hurdles: 8.85 NiR (2005)
 High jump: 1.52 (2006)
 Long Jump: 5.58 NiR (2005)
 Triple jump: 12.47 (2009)
 Pentathlon: 3251 pts NiR (2006)

Competition record

References

External links
 
NBC Olympics Profile

1990 births
Living people
Syrian heptathletes
Syrian female athletes
Syrian female hurdlers
Olympic athletes of Syria
Athletes (track and field) at the 2008 Summer Olympics
Athletes (track and field) at the 2006 Asian Games
Asian Games competitors for Syria
Sportspeople from Homs
21st-century Syrian women